Mbereshi (also spelled and pronounced Mbeleshi) is a village in the Luapula Province of Zambia, named after the Mbereshi River on its north side. It is the site of a large mission founded in 1900 by the London Missionary Society. In 1915 the mission established Mbereshi Girls' School, the first girls' school in the territory, as well as a boys' school and a large hospital. The Girls school and Hospital are now Grant Aided  institutions run by The United Church of Zambia. Mbereshi contains a number of examples of mission buildings, including a large church which is now part of the United Church of Zambia.

References

Christian missions in Zambia
Populated places in Luapula Province
1900 establishments in the British Empire